Vegakameratene (founded 24 April 2008) is a Norwegian futsal team currently playing in Eliteserien, the Norwegian top division. The club is currently based in Trondheim, but has origins at the island of Vega in Nordland. It has been a part of the top division since the creation of the league in 2008/2009, and has since its first league title in 2010/2011 been able to defend the title three consecutive times. As Norwegian champions, Vegakameratene has represented Norway in the UEFA Futsal Cup four times, and was the first Norwegian team advancing to the Main round back in 2011. In 2014, the team was admitted directly to the Main round, after being ranked as the 17th best team participating.

Eliteserien

UEFA Futsal Cup

Coach 
Kai Bardal has been the coach of Vegakameratene since its foundation in 2008.

References 

Futsal clubs in Norway
Sport in Trondheim
Futsal clubs established in 2008
2008 establishments in Norway